Anam Amin (born 11 August 1992) is a Pakistani cricketer who currently plays for Pakistan as a slow left-arm orthodox bowler. She has also played domestic cricket for Punjab, Higher Education Commission, Lahore, Zarai Taraqiati Bank Limited and State Bank of Pakistan.

In October 2018, she was named in Pakistan's squad for the 2018 ICC Women's World Twenty20 tournament in the West Indies. Ahead of the tournament, she was named as one of the players to watch. In January 2020, she was named in Pakistan's squad for the 2020 ICC Women's T20 World Cup in Australia. In October 2021, she was named in Pakistan's team for the 2021 Women's Cricket World Cup Qualifier tournament in Zimbabwe. The following month, in Pakistan's opening match against the West Indies, she took her first five-wicket haul in WODIs.

In January 2022, she was named in Pakistan's team for the 2022 Women's Cricket World Cup in New Zealand. In May 2022, she was named in Pakistan's team for the cricket tournament at the 2022 Commonwealth Games in Birmingham, England.

References

External links
 
 

1992 births
Living people
Cricketers from Lahore
Pakistani women cricketers
Pakistan women One Day International cricketers
Pakistan women Twenty20 International cricketers
Punjab (Pakistan) women cricketers
Higher Education Commission women cricketers
Lahore women cricketers
Zarai Taraqiati Bank Limited women cricketers
State Bank of Pakistan women cricketers
Asian Games medalists in cricket
Cricketers at the 2014 Asian Games
Asian Games gold medalists for Pakistan
Medalists at the 2014 Asian Games
Cricketers at the 2022 Commonwealth Games
Commonwealth Games competitors for Pakistan
People from Lahore